Fromental is a commune in the Haute-Vienne department in the Nouvelle-Aquitaine region in west-central France.

Geography
The river Semme flows through the commune's northern part and forms part of its northern and western borders.

Inhabitants are known as Fromentaux in French.

See also
Communes of the Haute-Vienne department

References

Communes of Haute-Vienne